Jean Margaret Lodge (born 4 August 1927) is an English stage, film and television actress.

Career
In 1952 she appeared alongside Claude Hulbert in the West End in Constance Cox's Lord Arthur Savile's Crime. In 1954 she starred in William Douglas Home's The Manor of Northstead.

She played Guinevere in The Black Knight and Lady Netherden in The Hellfire Club.

Personal life
Lodge had two children with Alfred Shaughnessy. They are actor Charles and producer/actor David. Charles is best known for his role as Maxwell Sheffield on The Nanny.

Selected filmography
 Dick Barton Strikes Back (1949)
 Doctor Morelle (1949)
 Blackout (1950)
 White Corridors (1951)
 Death of an Angel (1952)
 Brandy for the Parson (1952)
 Glad Tidings (1953)
 Dangerous Voyage (1954)
 The Black Knight (1954)
 Johnny on the Spot (1954)
 Final Appointment (1954)
 The Hellfire Club (1961)
 Accidental Death (1963)
 The Eyes of Annie Jones (1964)
 Curse of Simba (1965)
 Invasion (1965)

References

External links 

1927 births
Living people
English film actresses
Actresses from Kingston upon Hull
20th-century English actresses
English stage actresses
English television actresses